Eaucourt is part of the name of several communes in France:

 Eaucourt-sur-Somme, in the Somme département
 Sommette-Eaucourt, in the Aisne département
 Warlencourt-Eaucourt, in the Pas-de-Calais département